Ancylolomia is a genus of moths of the family Crambidae described by Jacob Hübner in 1825.

Description
Palpi porrect (stretched forward), thickly clothed with hair, and extending about three times the length of head. Maxillary palp triangularly scaled. Frons oblique. Abdomen long. Tibia with outer spurs about two-thirds lengths of inner. Forewings long and narrow. The rounded apex. The outer margin excised below apex, then excurved. Veins 3, 4 and 5 from angle of cell and veins 7, 8 and 9 stalked. Vein 10 free and vein 11 becoming coincident with vein 12. Hindwings with vein 3 from close to angle of cell. Veins 4 and 5 from angle or stalked. Vein 6 from above middle of discocellulars and obsolescent. Vein 7 anastomosing (fused together) with vein 8.

Species
Ancylolomia aduncella Wang & Sung, 1981
Ancylolomia agraphella Hampson, 1919
Ancylolomia albicostalis Hampson, 1919
Ancylolomia arabella Błeszyński, 1965
Ancylolomia argentata Moore, 1885
Ancylolomia argenteovittata Aurivillius, 1910
Ancylolomia atrifasciata Hampson, 1919
Ancylolomia auripaleella Marion, 1954
Ancylolomia caffra Zeller, 1877
Ancylolomia capensis Zeller, 1852
Ancylolomia carcinella Wang & Sung, 1981
Ancylolomia castaneata Hampson, 1919
Ancylolomia cervicella Błeszyński, 1970
Ancylolomia chrysargyria Hampson, 1919
Ancylolomia chrysographellus (Kollar & Redtenbacher, 1844)
Ancylolomia claudia Bassi, 2013
Ancylolomia croesus Hampson, 1919
Ancylolomia disparalis Hübner, 1825
Ancylolomia dives Hampson, 1919
Ancylolomia drosogramma Meyrick, 1936
Ancylolomia elisa Bassi, 2013
Ancylolomia elongata D. Lucas, 1917
Ancylolomia endophaealis Hampson, 1910
Ancylolomia felderella Błeszyński, 1970
Ancylolomia fulvitinctalis Hampson, 1919
Ancylolomia gracilis Fawcett, 1918
Ancylolomia hamatella Wang & Sung, 1981
Ancylolomia holochrea Hampson, 1919
Ancylolomia indica C. Felder, R. Felder & Rogenhofer, 1875
Ancylolomia inornata Staudinger, 1870
Ancylolomia intricata Błeszyński, 1970
Ancylolomia irrorata Hampson, 1919
Ancylolomia jacquelinae Rougeot, 1984
Ancylolomia japonica Zeller, 1877
Ancylolomia kuznetzovi Błeszyński, 1965
Ancylolomia laverna Błeszyński, 1970
Ancylolomia lentifascialis Hampson, 1919
Ancylolomia likiangella Błeszyński, 1970
Ancylolomia locupletellus (Kollar & Redtenbacher, 1844)
Ancylolomia longicorniella Song & Chen in Chen, Song, Yuan & Zhang, 2004
Ancylolomia melanella Hampson, 1919
Ancylolomia melanothoracia Hampson, 1919
Ancylolomia micropalpella Amsel, 1951
Ancylolomia minutella Turati, 1926
Ancylolomia mirabilis Wallengren, 1876
Ancylolomia nigrifasciata Bassi, 2004
Ancylolomia obscurella de Joannis, 1927
Ancylolomia obstitella (Swinhoe, 1886)
Ancylolomia ophiralis Hampson, 1919
Ancylolomia orchidea Błeszyński, 1970
Ancylolomia palpella (Denis & Schiffermüller, 1775)
Ancylolomia paraetoniella Turati, 1924
Ancylolomia parentii Bassi in Bassi & Trematerra, 2014
Ancylolomia pectinatellus (Zeller, 1847)
Ancylolomia pectinifera Hampson, 1910
Ancylolomia perfasciata Hampson, 1919
Ancylolomia planicosta E. L. Martin, 1956
Ancylolomia prepiella Hampson, 1919
Ancylolomia punctistrigellus (Mabille, 1880)
Ancylolomia rotaxella Błeszyński, 1965
Ancylolomia saharae P. Leraut, 2012
Ancylolomia sansibarica Zeller, 1877
Ancylolomia saundersiella Zeller, 1863
Ancylolomia shafferi Rougeot, 1977
Ancylolomia shefferialis Rougeot, 1984
Ancylolomia simplella de Joannis, 1913
Ancylolomia taprobanensis Zeller, 1863
Ancylolomia tentaculella (Hübner, 1796)
Ancylolomia tripolitella Rebel, 1909
Ancylolomia tripunctalis Maes, 2011
Ancylolomia umbonella Wang & Sung, 1981
Ancylolomia uniformella Hampson, 1896
Ancylolomia westwoodi Zeller, 1863

References

 , 2004: Crambidae: Crambinae and Cybalomiinae (Lepidoptera, Pyraloidea). – In: W. Mey (ed.), The Lepidoptera of the Brandberg Massif in Namibia, Part 1. Esperiana Buchreihe zur Entomologie Memoir 1: 215–220.
 , 1970: A revision of the Oriental species of the genus Ancylolomia Hübner (Studies on the Crambinae, Lepidoptera Pyralidae part 49). Tijdschrift voor Entomologie 113 (1): 27-43.
 , 2011: New Crambidae from the Afrotropical region (Lepidoptera: Pyraloidea: Crambidae). Lambillionea 111 (3) Tome 1: 241-248.
 , 1982: New species and new records of the genus Ancylolomia Hübner from China with notes on specifying the Palaearctic species groups (Lepidoptera: Pyralidae). Acta Entomologica Sinica 24 (2): 196-202.

 
Crambidae genera
Taxa named by Jacob Hübner